Dornelles is a surname. Notable people with the surname include:

Francisco Dornelles (born 1935), Brazilian lawyer, economist, and politician
Getúlio Dornelles Vargas (1882–1954), Brazilian lawyer and politician